is a Japanese manga artist and a member of the Year 24 Group. She made her professional debut in 1969 with the short story  in Bessatsu Margaret. She is best known for her manga series , serialized from 1977 to 1984 in LaLa, which follows a romance between two young men at the start of the Shōwa era.

In 2017, to commemorate Kihara's 48th anniversary as a manga artist, Kawade Shobo Shinsha published a book containing a chronological list of all of her works; a lengthy interview with Kihara about her career; a round-table discussion between Kihara and her fellow Year 24 Group members, Moto Hagio and Yasuko Aoike; and contributions from other celebrated manga artists, such as Riyoko Ikeda and Yasuko Sakata.

The same year, Kihara's first solo art exhibition was held at the Span Art Gallery in Ginza, Tokyo, Japan, from November 3 to November 14, 2017. The exhibition was also held at the Niigata City Manga House in Niigata, Japan, from June 21 to October 9, 2018. During its run, Kihara made several appearances at the gallery to sign autographs.

Works

 
 
 An adaptation of Anne Golon's Angélique novel series

References

External links
 Official Twitter account 
 Q&A with fans at Monthly Flowers 
 

1948 births
Female comics writers
Japanese female comics artists
Japanese women writers
Living people
Manga artists from Tokyo
People from Tokyo
Women manga artists